Homola barbata is a species of crab in the family Homolidae.

Description
They usually have squarish carapaces with forward-pointing spines along the upper front edges. The animal's chelipeds are shorter than their other legs (the back pair are short, thin and doubled back on themselves).

Ecology
They feed on algae, small mollusks and also scavenge for food. Reproduction is sexual, and through copulation.

Distribution
In the eastern part of its range, Homola barbata is found in the Mediterranean Sea and into the North Atlantic. In the western part of its range, H. barbata is found from Virginia southwards, through the Gulf of Mexico and the West Indies, along the coasts of Central and South America to Rio Grande do Sul, Brazil.

References

Dromiacea
Crustaceans of the Atlantic Ocean
Crustaceans described in 1793